Lucas Digne (born 20 July 1993) is a French professional footballer who plays as a left-back for  club Aston Villa and the France national team.

Digne began his career at Lille before joining Paris Saint-Germain in 2013. After spending a season on loan at Roma, he moved to Barcelona in July 2016. Despite not playing regularly at either club, he won twelve honours at Paris and Barcelona combined. He joined Everton in August 2018, making 113 appearances before transferring to Aston Villa in January 2022.

Digne won the 2013 World Cup with the France under-20 team, and made his senior international debut in March 2014. He represented France at the 2014 FIFA World Cup, UEFA Euro 2016 (where his nation reached the final), and UEFA Euro 2020.

Club career

Lille 

Born in Meaux, Seine-et-Marne, Digne finished his development at Lille, signing his first professional contract on 27 July 2010 for three years. Ahead of the 2011–12 season, Digne was promoted to the senior team permanently and assigned the number 3 shirt. He made his professional debut on 26 October 2011 in a 6–1 victory over Sedan in the last 16 of the Coupe de la Ligue.

In January 2012, Digne extended his contract until 2016. On 28 January, he made his Ligue 1 debut at the Stadium Nord Lille Metropole, playing the final two minutes of a 3–0 win over Saint-Étienne. He totalled 16 league appearances as the defending champions came third.

Digne was a regular in the 2012–13 season. On 23 February 2013, having given Lille the lead in a 3–1 win at Ajaccio when his cross was deflected in by Yoann Poulard, he was sent off after an hour for a foul on Matthieu Chalmé. He scored his first goal on 7 April, a penalty in a 5–0 home win over Lorient, and two weeks later he added another to equalise in a 2–1 comeback victory at Bastia.

Paris Saint-Germain 
On 17 July 2013, Digne signed a five-year deal with Paris Saint-Germain, on a fee believed to be around €15 million. On 3 August, he was an unused substitute as they won the 2013 Trophée des Champions with a 2–1 victory over Bordeaux in Gabon. He did not make his debut until 13 September in a 2–0 win at the same opponents, as manager Laurent Blanc rotated his squad ahead of the UEFA Champions League. PSG ended the season with both the league and league cup titles, though Digne was back-up to Brazilian veteran Maxwell.

Digne played the full 90 minutes in the 2014 Trophée des Champions, which PSG won 2–0 against Guingamp in Beijing. The Parisians won all four domestic honours in 2014–15, with Digne an unused substitute in their Coupe de France and Coupe de la Ligue final victories.

Roma (loan) 
On 26 August 2015, Italian Serie A club Roma signed Digne from PSG on a season-long loan deal for €2.5 million, with the option to make the move permanent at the end of the season. He made his debut five days later, playing the entire match in a 2–1 victory against title holders Juventus at the Stadio Olimpico. He blew a sarcastic kiss at opponent Roberto Pereyra and advised him to check the scoreboard, a gesture likened to one by Roma captain Francesco Totti to Igor Tudor of the same rival in a 4–0 win in February 2004.

Digne scored his first goal for the Giallorossi on 26 September with a close-range header in a 5–1 home win over Carpi, having earlier assisted Kostas Manolas in opening his account for the club. Against the same opponents on 12 February, he returned from injury to score from 30 metres in a 3–1 win, and on 17 April he opened a 3–3 draw at Atalanta. The team from Italy's capital came third in Serie A, and Digne declared that he wanted the move to be made permanent.

Barcelona 

On 13 July 2016, Digne joined Spanish La Liga side Barcelona on a five-year deal. The fee was €16.5 million (£13.8 million), with the possibility to increase to €20.5 million (£17.1 million), according to individual and team results. On 14 August 2016, Digne made his first appearance for Barcelona in a 0–2 victory against Sevilla in the 2016 Supercopa de España first leg, as a 27th-minute substitute for compatriot Jérémy Mathieu.

He played 26 total games in his first season at the Camp Nou, scoring once in a 7–0 (8–1 aggregate) win over Segunda División B club Hércules in the last 32 of the Copa del Rey on 21 December 2016. Barcelona won that cup, with Digne unused in the final on 27 May 2017, a 3–1 win over Alavés.

Digne played 20 times in 2017–18 as Barcelona won the league and cup double under new manager Ernesto Valverde. On 18 October 2017, he scored from Lionel Messi's assist in a 3–1 home win over Olympiacos in the Champions League group stage.

Everton 
Digne joined English club Everton on 1 August 2018, for a five-year deal on an initial fee of £18 million. He made his debut ten days later, replacing double goalscorer and fellow debutant Richarlison for the last four minutes of a 2–2 draw at Wolverhampton Wanderers. On his first start on 29 August in a 3–1 EFL Cup win against Rotherham United, he assisted a goal from Dominic Calvert-Lewin. Digne made his first Premier League start for Everton four days later in a home game against Huddersfield Town, and assisted Calvert-Lewin's headed equaliser in a 1–1 draw.

By the start of October, Digne had become Everton's first-choice left back, ahead of veteran Leighton Baines. He scored his first goal for the club on 10 December, in the sixth minute of stoppage time at the end of a match against Watford, curling in a free kick for a 2–2 draw. Sixteen days later he scored twice in a 5–1 win at Burnley, with a free kick and a 30-yard shot. On 29 January 2019 he was sent off in a 1–0 win at Huddersfield for denying Adama Diakhaby a goalscoring opportunity with a foul. Digne's first season at Everton concluded with individual honours as he was named the Club’s Player of the Season, as voted for by supporters, and Players' Player of the Season alongside midfielder Idrissa Gueye, the first time the award had been shared.

On 25 October 2020, Digne was sent off in a 2–0 loss at Southampton for a foul on Kyle Walker-Peters. Referee Kevin Friend recorded it as "serious foul play" which is punished with a three-game suspension, but the ban was reduced to one match on appeal.

In January 2022, Digne told Everton manager Rafael Benítez that he no longer wanted to play for the club and wished to leave. He had argued with the manager over tactics.

Aston Villa 
On 13 January 2022, Aston Villa announced the signing of Digne from Everton for a fee of £25 million, with a contract until 2026. He made his debut two days later, in a 2–2 home draw with Manchester United. On 23 August, Digne scored his first goal for the team in a 4–1 victory at Bolton Wanderers in the second round of the EFL Cup.

On 21 September 2022, Digne suffered a stress fracture to his ankle whilst on international duty with France. This kept him out of the squad until 29 October, when he returned as a second-half substitute in a 4–0 defeat to Newcastle United.

International career 

Digne was a French youth international and represented his nation at the U16, U17, and U18 levels. At the 2013 FIFA U-20 World Cup in Turkey, he played every match as France won the title.

He was first called up for the senior side in February 2014, ahead of a friendly match against the Netherlands on 5 March. He debuted in that match, as a half-time substitute for Patrice Evra in a 2–0 win at the Stade de France.

In June, manager Didier Deschamps named Digne as one of 23 members of the French squad for the 2014 FIFA World Cup in Brazil, wearing the number 17 shirt. His one appearance for the eventual quarter-finalists was the third group game against Ecuador, in which he suffered a foul that earned the Ecuadorian captain Antonio Valencia a straight red card.

Digne was chosen for the French squad that came runners-up on home soil at UEFA Euro 2016, but did not play. He was put on standby for the squad at the 2018 FIFA World Cup in Russia.

At UEFA Euro 2020, Digne came on at half time in the 2–2 group draw with Portugal due to Lucas Hernandez's injury. Minutes later, he too withdrew due to a thigh muscle injury. The injuries at left back forced Deschamps to use an untested 3–5–2 formation in the last 16 against Switzerland, which France lost.

Personal life 
On 27 December  2014, Digne married his girlfriend Tiziri, whom he met while both were in school. The couple have a son and a daughter. 

Digne was in Barcelona when it was hit by a terror attack on 17 August 2017, and gave first aid to the victims.

Career statistics

Club

International

Honours
Paris Saint-Germain
Ligue 1: 2013–14, 2014–15
Coupe de France: 2014–15
Coupe de la Ligue: 2013–14, 2014–15
Trophée des Champions: 2013, 2014, 2015

Barcelona
La Liga: 2017–18
Copa del Rey: 2016–17, 2017–18
Supercopa de España: 2016

France U20
FIFA U-20 World Cup: 2013

France
 UEFA Nations League: 2020–21

Individual
Everton Players' Player of the Season: 2018–19 (shared with Idrissa Gueye)

References

External links 

 Profile at the Aston Villa F.C. website
 
 
 
 
 
 

1993 births
Living people
French footballers
Association football fullbacks
People from Meaux
Footballers from Seine-et-Marne
Lille OSC players
Paris Saint-Germain F.C. players
A.S. Roma players
FC Barcelona players
Everton F.C. players
Aston Villa F.C. players
Ligue 1 players
Serie A players
La Liga players
Premier League players
France youth international footballers
France under-21 international footballers
France international footballers
2014 FIFA World Cup players
UEFA Euro 2016 players
UEFA Euro 2020 players
UEFA Nations League-winning players
French expatriate footballers
French expatriate sportspeople in Italy
French expatriate sportspeople in Spain
French expatriate sportspeople in England
Expatriate footballers in Italy
Expatriate footballers in Spain
Expatriate footballers in England